HAT-P-28 is the primary of a binary star system about 1320 light-years away. It is a G-type main-sequence star. The star’s age is older than the Sun`s at 6.1 billion years. HAT-P-28 is slightly enriched in heavy elements, having a 130% concentration of iron compared to the Sun. Since 2014, the binary star system is suspected to be surrounded by a debris disk with a 6.1″(2500 AU) radius.

The red dwarf stellar companion was detected in 2015 at a projected separation of 0.972″ and confirmed in 2016 to be either bound or comoving.

Planetary system
In 2011 a transiting hot Jupiter planet b was detected on a nearly circular orbit. The planetary equilibrium temperature is 1384 K. No orbital decay was detected as in 2018, despite the close proximity of the planet to the host star.

References

Andromeda (constellation)
G-type main-sequence stars
Binary stars
Planetary systems with one confirmed planet
Planetary transit variables
J00520018+3443422